Dmitri Alexeyevich Frolov (born February 27, 1966) is a Russian film director in independent experimental cinema and a director of photography.

Biography
Frolov was born in Leningrad on February 27, 1966. In 1990, he graduated from the University of Cinema and Television. A screenwriter, director and cameraman, Frolov took part in more than 30 short films. He was included in several domestic film festivals – including Kinoshok in Anapa, Pure Dreams in St. Petersburg, and Cine Phantom Fest in Moscow – and foreign ones. He also shot music videos for the group Auktsion, and worked as the senior operator of the TV channel 100TV.

He makes aesthetic experiments connecting with return to silent cinema on new level of film language.

He is a laureate of the National Award "TEFI-2008" in the nomination "Operator of a TV film / series".

In 2022 he won the special festival mention award at the first season of Casablanca Film Factory Awards.

Filmography

Director 

Films
1987 – Dream
1988 – The Way
1988 – Metamorphosis
1988 – Theater. Afterword
1989 – Act
1989 – Clownery
1990 – Without words
1990 – The Second Birth
1991 – KARA
1991 – Psycho Attack Over Soviets
1991 – The Leaving
1991 – Beekeeper
1990–1993 – The Big Moon Nights
1994 – Do not august, 1991
1994 – Stairway to the sky
1995 – Above the Lake (silent version)
1995 – Underwater Guest
1996 – Das Es
1997 – Be Careful!
1997 – Ten minutes of silence
1998 – The Little Sotmaid
1999 – Rumba
2000 – Decease
2001 – The Granny's Apocrypha
2002 – Tango Nightingale
2002 – The Two
1991–2003 – Phantoms of white nights
2004 – The daddy's meat
2006 – Above the Lake (version with sound)
2010 – Wellspring
2010 – The Birth of Music
2010 – Conversation
2016 – The Lone
2017 – Last Love
2018 – Winter Will Not Be
2019 – Moonlight People
2020 – Borodino
2021 – Astronaut's Uniform
2022 – Dreams of the Past

Video clips
1991 – Let her know (group "Esty")
1992 – The crazy city (the group "Inflatable gun")
2000 – Something like this (Leonid Fedorov ("Auktsion")
2000 – There will be no winters (Leonid Fedorov ("Auktsion")
2000 – Head-leg (Leonid Fedorov ("Auktsion")
2000 – Lady Dee (Leonid Fedorov ("Auktsion")
2000 – Far away (Leonid Fedorov ("Auktsion")
2002 – Yagoda (Leonid Fedorov ("Auktsion")
2002 – Catholics (Leonid Fedorov ("Auktsion")
2003 – Let (Leonid Fedorov ("Auktsion")
2017 – Time, back! (Sergey Oskolkov)

Cinematographer 

1993 – The Battle of Leningrad (directed by N. Klyuchnikov)
1994 – The life and adventures of 4 friends (directed by O. Yeryshev)
1994–1995 – A series of documentary reports about Timur Novikov and the New Academy of Fine Arts (directed by L. Chibor)
1995 – The acceptance of fate (directed by L. Chibor)
1996 – Presence (directed by A.Kuklin)
1996 – After 300 years (director G.Novikov)
1998 – Courant (directed by A.Kuklin)
1999 – Artist Gleb Bogomolov (director L. Chibor)
2000 – How "Brother-2" was shot (director V.Nepevny, T. Ober) 
2000 – Nobody writes to the Colonel (video clip of the BI-2 group)
2000 – The Wizard of our city (directed by R. Rachev)
2000 – Ugar (directed by G.Novikov)
2001 – Dark Night (directed by O. Kovalov (samples)
2001 – Daughter of Albion (directed by K.Kasatov)
2001 – Fairy Tales (directed by B.Gorlov, K.Kasatov)
2002 – Song (directed by L. Yunina)
2002 – Mozart. Fantasy in the cafe (director G.Novikov)
2003 – "Adjacent Rooms" (directed by K.Seliverstov)
2003 – Kira (directed by V.Nepevny)
2004 – Living in History (directed by G.Novikov)
2004 – Children of corn (director M.Zheleznikov)
2004 – Merry plumber (director V.Nepevny)
2005 – Light in August (director G.Novikov)
2005 – "School of Baba Yaga" (directed by A.Chikichev)
2007 – "The color of time" (directed by K.Kasatov)
2008 – "Children of the Siege" (directed by A.Chikichev)
2008 – "Autograph of Time" (directed by A.Chikichev)
2008 – "Hello, the land of heroes!" (Directed by A.Chikichev)
2009 – "My contemporaries" (directed by A.Chikichev)
2009 – "For Home Viewing" (directed by M.Zheleznikov)
2010 – "Vasily Turkin. The book about the fighter "(directed by S. Lyalkin)
2010 – "The Seasons" (directed by S. Lyalkin)
2013 – "A Successful Visit" (directed by L. Galkin)
2017 – "Unknown Leningrad Region" (directed by S. Lyalkin)
2017 – "Last Love"
2019 – "Moonlight People"
2022 – "Dreams of the Past"
TV: 1996–1999 – series of programs "Line of Cinema" (ORT-1 channel) (prize of the festival "White pillars" in 1999)

Actor

References

External links

 
 

1966 births
Russian film directors
Russian male actors
Soviet male actors
Russian cinematographers
Soviet film directors
Mass media people from Saint Petersburg
Surrealist filmmakers
Russian experimental filmmakers
Living people
People's Artists of Russia
20th-century Russian male actors
Silent film directors